Johanna Knoteck, known as Hansi Knoteck (2 March 1914 – 23 February 2014), was an Austrian film actress.

Selected filmography
 Count Woronzeff (1934)
 Hubertus Castle (1934)
 The Gypsy Baron (1935)
 The Saint and Her Fool (1935)
 The Girl from the Marsh Croft (1935)
 Winter in the Woods (1936)
 The Man Who Was Sherlock Holmes (1937)
 Ride to Freedom (1937)
 Diamonds (1937)
 When Women Keep Silent (1937)
 Storms in May (1938)
 The Sinful Village (1940)
 Venus on Trial (1941)
 Border Post 58 (1951)
 Heimat Bells (1952)
 House of Life (1952)
 The Beginning Was Sin (1954)
 The Dark Star (1955)
 The Priest from Kirchfeld (1955)
 The Hunter of Fall (1974)

References

External links
 
 Obituary (in German)

1914 births
2014 deaths
Austrian film actresses
20th-century Austrian actresses
Actresses from Vienna